Local elections were held in the United Kingdom in 1986. There was a 3% reduction in the number of councillors, owing to the abolition of the Greater London Council and the Metropolitan County Councils.

The national projected share of the vote was Labour 37%, Conservative 34%, Liberal-SDP Alliance 26%.  The Conservatives lost 975 seats, Labour gained 13 seats and the Liberal-SDP Alliance gained 338 seats.

Summary of results

England

London boroughs

In all 32 London boroughs the whole council was up for election.

Metropolitan boroughs
All 36 metropolitan borough councils had one third of their seats up for election.

District councils

Whole council
In 2 districts the whole council was up for election.

In 2 districts there were new ward boundaries, following further electoral boundary reviews by the Local Government Boundary Commission for England.

‡ New ward boundaries

Third of council
In 121 districts one third of the council was up for election.

Local education authority
This was the first and only election to the directly elected local education authority established by the Local Government Act 1985. However, it was short-lived, being abolished four years later by the Education Reform Act 1988.

Scotland

Regional councils

References

Local elections 2006. House of Commons Library Research Paper 06/26.
Vote 1999 BBC News
Vote 2000 BBC News